The Frozen Dead is a French mystery thriller television series from channel M6, set in the French Pyrenees. The six-episode series is an adaptation of the novel of the same name by Bernard Minier.

The Frozen Dead premiered in France on M6 on 10 January 2017. It became available for streaming in Australia on SBS on Demand in August 2017, and released internationally on Netflix on 1 January 2018.

Plot
The story begins with the discovery of the headless corpse of a horse that belongs to wealthy businessman Eric Lombard, in the French Pyrenees town of Saint-Martin-de-Comminges.  The case is then investigated by Commander Martin Servaz, assisted by local police Captain Irène Ziegler.

When Servaz and Ziegler find the horse's head, they also find at the crime scene DNA that is determined to be that of serial killer Julian Hirtmann. Hirtmann, however, is incarcerated at Warnier, a high-security psychiatric prison, where young psychiatrist Diane Berg is showing an unusual interest in him.  The case is later found to be linked to the suicides of three teenage girls at a summer camp 15 years earlier.

Cast and characters

Main

 Charles Berling as Cmdr. Martin Servaz, head of the criminal investigation department of a Toulouse police division
 Julia Piaton as Capt. Irène Ziegler, head of Saint Martin's detective squad
 Pascal Greggory as Julian Hirtmann, a former prosecutor incarcerated in Warnier
 Nina Meurisse as Diane Berg, a new psychiatrist at the prison
 Lubna Azabal as Elisabeth Ferney, the head psychiatrist at the prison
 Anne Le Ny as Catherine "Cathy" d'Humières, a town prosecutor.
 Robinson Stévenin as Raphaël Delaunay
 Robert Plagnol as Eric Lombard, wealthy owner of "Freedom", the decapitated horse
 Sophie Guillemin as Greta, partner of Irène Ziegler and owner of the local inn where Servaz is staying

Recurring

 Alain Fromager as Francois Levasseur

Development and production
The series was produced by Gaumont Télévision and co-produced by Metropole Television. Directed by Laurent Herbiet, it was created and written by Gérard Carré, Caroline Van Ruymbeke and Pascal Chaumeil, with a script from Hamid Hlioua and Laurent Herbiet based on the 2011 novel Glacé by Bernard Minier.  Filming in the French Pyrenees started on 15 February 2016 and wrapped in early April. Among the locations used are the towns of Bagnères-de-Luchon and Garin, and the Peyragudes ski resort.

The image used in the title sequence was inspired by a painting by August Friedrich Schenck and represents the harshness of winter and the cruelty of predators towards their prey. The  mysterious cloaked figure symbolizes Julian Hirtmann, the manipulative character in the series. The title sequence is accompanied by a children's choir rendition of the song "Hurt" by Nine Inch Nails.

Release
The Frozen Dead premiered in France on 10 January 2017. Netflix acquired worldwide distributions rights in October 2017, and released the series from 1 January 2018 to October 2021.

Reception

Ratings
The debut on M6 was watched by a peak overnight audience of 4.85 million viewers, an audience share of 19.3%. It was the best premiere of a French drama on the channel since 2010.  It averaged at 4.3 million over the first two episodes in the first week, and reached 5.1 million viewers over a seven-day period. However, the audience totals decreased in the subsequent weeks, falling to 2.8 million for the next two episodes the following week, and 2.7 million viewers for the final two episodes.  It had an average audience of 3.28 million (14% audience share) over the entire series, rising to 4 million in consolidated ratings with an average gain of 760,000 viewers per episode, the best 7 day catch up viewing figure for the channel since Quantico.

Awards and nominations
The Frozen Dead was an entry at the Festival de la Fiction TV de La Rochelle in September 2016, where it won the "Best Series" award.

Episodes

Season 1 (2017)

References

External links

  The Frozen Dead on Netflix

  Glacé at Bernard Minier.com

2010s French television series
French crime drama television series
Television shows set in France
French-language Netflix original programming